Leon Major (born 1933, Toronto) is a Canadian opera and theatre director. He is the Artistic Director of The Maryland Opera Studio for the University of Maryland, College Park. From 1998-2003 he was Artistic Director of Boston Lyric Opera and from 2003–2007 he was artistic consultant for Opera Cleveland.

He has directed opera and theatre throughout the Americas and Europe for companies that include: New York City Opera, Washington Opera, Glimmerglass Opera, San Diego Opera, Vancouver Opera, Teatro Municipale (Rio de Janeiro), The Opera Company of Philadelphia, Florentine Opera, Austin Lyric Opera, Wolf Trap Opera Company, the Canadian Opera Company and The Opera Festival of New Jersey.

Among the productions he has directed are: Macbeth, Falstaff, Intermezzo, Volpone, Don Pasquale, Don Carlos, Resurrection, Aida, Don Giovanni, Roméo et Juliette, La traviata, L'elisir d'amore, Carmen (on Boston Common) Eugene Onegin, The Aspern Papers, Cosi fan tutte, Il barbiere di Siviglia, and Peter Grimes. Of his New York City Opera production, the New York Times said: "Falstaff [was] directed with vitality and imagination by Leon Major." His 1981 Stratford Shakespeare Festival production of H.M.S. Pinafore was later presented for broadcast on television.

Aside from his work as an independent director, Major has given master classes in Mexico City, The Shanghai Conservatory, Tel Aviv (Israeli Vocal Arts Institute) and Toronto's Royal Conservatory of Music. He was the Founding and first Artistic Director of the Neptune Theatre in Halifax, Nova Scotia, and served for ten years as Artistic and General Director of Toronto Arts Productions which was the founding company at the St. Lawrence Centre for the Arts in Toronto. Major is a graduate of the University of Toronto, has an honorary doctorate from Dalhousie University and is a Member of the Order of Canada.

A new opera, Shadowboxer, based on the life of Joe Louis and conceived and directed by Major, premiered on 17 April 2010 at the University of Maryland's Clarice Smith Performing Arts Center.

References

Schabas, Ezra, There's Music in These Walls: A History of the Royal Conservatory of Music, Dundurn Press Ltd., 2005 pp. 176–177.

External links
 official website: www.leonmajor.com
Leon Major, faculty page, University of Maryland School of Music
Leon Major Interview, Legend Library, TheatreMuseumCanada

1933 births
Canadian opera directors
Living people
Members of the Order of Canada
People from Toronto
University of Toronto alumni
University of Maryland, College Park faculty
Canadian artistic directors